This is a list of the national coats of arms or equivalent emblems used by countries and dependent territories in Europe.

Sovereign states

Other sovereign entities

Disputed and/or unrecognised countries

Dependent territories

See also
 Flags of Europe
 Armorial of sovereign states
 Armorial of Africa
 Armorial of North America
 Armorial of South America
 Armorial of Asia
 Armorial of Oceania

Notes

References

Europe
 
Europe-related lists
Europe
Europe